Isla Monserrate, is an island in the Gulf of California east of the Baja California Peninsula. The island is uninhabited and is part of the Loreto Municipality.

Biology
Isla Monserrate has 13 species of reptiles, including the endemic Isla Monserrate whiptail (Aspidoscelis pictus).

References

Further reading

Islands of the Gulf of California
Islands of Baja California Sur
Loreto Municipality (Baja California Sur)
Uninhabited islands of Mexico